"" ("But if I think about it") is a song in the Genoese dialect of Ligurian. It has a central role in the folklore of the Italian city of Genoa and is commonly quoted as one of its symbols. "" was launched in 1925. Its first performance was by soprano Luisa Rondolotti, in Genoa's .

Its lyrics speak of a Genoese emigrant to Latin America, who is thinking of coming back to his city. Notwithstanding his child's opposition, he finally goes back to Genoa.

Recordings
Other well known interpretations were that of Giuseppe Marzari and that, not sung but recited, of Gilberto Govi.  In 1967 Mina reinterpreted the song.  "" was also performed by Neapolitan singer Massimo Ranieri (together with Genoese showmen Luca Bizzarri and Paolo Kessisoglu) during the Sanremo Music Festival 2011.

Lyrics

Notes

References

Italian songs
Culture in Genoa
1925 songs